PlayStation Broadband Navigator (also referred to as BB Navigator and PSBBN) was a software program for Japanese PlayStation 2 consoles that provides an interface for manipulating data on PlayStation 2 HDD Unit.

History
 PSBBN version 0.10 - This prerelease version was released and bundled with Japanese PlayStation 2 BB Units (Network Adaptor and HDD bundle packs) in early 2002, replacing HDD Utility Disc 1.00. It lacked the ability to store and manage game saves on the HDD that HDD Utility Disc had.
 PSBBN version 0.20 was released in late 2002. It added functions to the interface of the software, including the ability to update itself to new versions over a broadband internet connection and management for game saves.
 PSBBN version 0.30 was released in mid-2003. It added access to Sony's feega service (which is used to bill the monthly fee for some online games) and an e-mail program. Version 0.31 was released in late 2003, fixing an exploit.
 PSBBN version 0.32 was released in early 2004 and is the most up-to-date version. The only change appears to be the removal of the Audio Player option inside the Music Channel, which allows to transfer music between the HDD and a MiniDisc player in earlier PSBBN versions.
Online services pertaining to the software closed on March 31, 2016.

Restrictions 
The PlayStation Broadband Navigator installation disc is reported to have a more strict region lock on it than normal PlayStation 2 software, as the software will only boot on NTSC-J systems with a model number ending in 0 (systems that are sold only in Japan), making the software unusable on Korean and Asian NTSC-J PlayStation 2 consoles. Furthermore, the software will not operate if a non-Sony brand network adapter is installed in the console.

Features
PlayStation Broadband Navigator offers many features that are not available with the default PS2 Navigator. Some Japanese releases take advantage of these features and may even require a specific version (or higher) of the software.

The features of the software include:
 Game Channel
 Access to online sites, similar to web pages, for various ISPs and software publishers (only in version 0.20 and higher)
 Downloadable game demos or full games (ex. Pop'n Taisen Puzzle-dama Online demo, Star Soldier BB full game, Milon's Secret Castle full game)
 Downloadable picture and movie files
 Information pages on past, current, and future releases and services
 A launching point for bootable games installed to the HDD
 NetFront 3.0, a Linux-based web browser
 Music Channel
 Provides a tool to convert an audio CD to audio files on the HDD
 Provides an organization system for audio files stored on the HDD and a means to play them
 Provides a means to transfer audio files between a MiniDisc player and the HDD over a USB connection (only in versions 0.20 through 0.31)
 Photo Channel
 Provides an organization system for picture files stored on the HDD and a means to view them
 Provides a means to transfer picture files between most USB storage devices and the HDD
 Movie Channel
 Provides an organization system for video files stored on the HDD and a means to view them
 feega account management (only in versions 0.30 and up; required for Net de Bomberman and Minna no Golf Online)

Non-Japanese Release
Sony Computer Entertainment America released the HDD on March 23, 2004 with HDD Utility Disc 1.01 and was bundled with Final Fantasy XI. Consumers that were aware of the PlayStation Broadband Navigator were confused as to why it wasn't included with the HDD Utility Disc. SCEA's response was always that the PlayStation Broadband Navigator would be released in North America "at a later date." Ultimately, the Broadband Navigator was never released outside of Japan, as Sony Computer Entertainment switched to only manufacturing the slim PlayStation 2 models, which never supported the HDD and furthermore and later ending the manufacturing of HDD units for the North American region. Furthermore, the HDD was never released in European regions by SCEE, with the exception of the Linux Kit.

The Broadband Navigator can be used on any PS2 by using a fan created modified/cracked build.

Compatible Software
See PlayStation 2 Expansion Bay.

See also
 XrossMediaBar (XMB)
 Central Station (online service)
 PlayOnline

References

External links
Unofficial English Manual for PSBBN 0.20-0.32
Official SCEA PlayStation 2 HDD Message Board (Closed as of June 14, 2005)

Broadband Navigator